Sancho of Castile may refer to:
 Sancho García of Castile (died 1017), Sancho of the Good Laws, Count of Castile
 Sancho II of León and Castile (–1072), Sancho the Strong, King of Castile and of León
 Sancho III of Castile (1134–1158), Sancho the Desired, King of Castile and of Toledo
 Sancho of Castile (bishop) (1233–1261), Castilian infante and Archbishop of Toledo
 Sancho IV of Castile (1258–1295), Sancho the Brave, King of Castile and León
 Sancho Alfonso, 1st Count of Alburquerque (1342–1374), Castilian infante